The Judiciary of Kenya is the system of courts that interprets and applies the law in Kenya. After the promulgation of the constitution of Kenya in 2010, the general public, through parliament, sought to reform the judiciary. Parliament passed the Magistrates and Judges Vetting Act of 2011. A major part of reforming the judiciary was the vetting of Magistrates and Judges in an attempt to weed out unsuitable ones. The Judicature Act has also been amended to raise the minimum number of Magistrates and Judges allowing more judicial officers to be hired. More magistrates and judges are needed to clear the backlog of cases that have caused great delay in the conclusion of cases and to staff new courts. New courts are needed to bring the courts closer to the people which is in line with devolution, a major principle written into the Constitution of 2010. New courts like the High Court opened in Garissa in November 2014 is a good example. In the past residents of North Eastern Kenya had to go all the way to Embu to access a High Court.

Courts
The Judiciary of Kenya consists of five Superior courts made up of the Supreme Court, Court of Appeals, High Court, Industrial Court, Environment and Land Court. The subordinate courts consist of the Magistrate Court, Courts Martial and Kadhi Court. According to the Kenyan constitution, the judiciary is the main actor when it comes to solving primary disputes, including more serious ones such as heinous crime. The main mission is the establishment of peace in society through law and order.

Supreme Court of Kenya

The Supreme Court is the highest court in Kenya, and all other courts are bound by its decisions. It was established under Article 163 of the Constitution as the final arbiter and interpreter of the Constitution.

It comprises the Chief Justice of Kenya who is the President of the Court, the Deputy Chief Justice who is the Vice-President of the Court and five other Judges. It sits at the Supreme Court Building (formerly the Court of Appeal in Nairobi Central Business District), and has to have a quorum of five judges.

Court of Appeal

This court handles appeal cases from the High Court and as prescribed by Parliament. It will constitute no less than 12 judges and will be headed by a President elected by the Court of Appeal judges among themselves. The current President of the Court of Appeal is Justice Daniel Musinga.
Each station of the court is led by a Presiding Judge.

High Court

The High Court of Kenya is established under Article 165 of the constitution of Kenya. It has supervisory jurisdiction over all other subordinate courts and any other persons, body or authority exercising a judicial or quasi-judicial function. The judges responsible elect one of them to act as the topmost principal judge in the court system. It has unlimited original jurisdiction and carries out supervisory roles.

Employment & Labour Relations Court (formerly the Industrial Court)
Established under Article 162(2)(a) of the Constitution of Kenya 2010 as well as The Employment & Labour Relations Act of 2011 - An Act of Parliament to establish the Employment and Labour Relations Court to hear and determine disputes relating to employment and labour relations and for connected purposes. Any disputes relating to employments is preliminarily held at this court, and any further proceedings are taken to the High Court if the case is not determined to conscience of the complainant.

Environment and Land Court
An Act of Parliament to give effect to Article 162(2)(b) of the Constitution; to establish a superior court to hear and determine disputes relating to the environment and the use and occupation of, and title to, land, and to make provision for its jurisdiction functions and powers, and for connected purposes

Subordinate Courts
The courts below the High Court are referred to as Subordinate courts. These are:

The Magistrate Court
Article 169 1(a) of the constitution of Kenya 2010 creates the Magistrate court. This is where majority of the judiciaries cases are heard. Magistrate courts are generally located in every county in Kenya. The new Magistrate Courts' Act 2015 significantly increases the pecuniary jurisdiction of magistrate courts. One of the most notable changes in terms of the expansion of the jurisdiction of the Magistrates Courts is with regard to the increase of the pecuniary jurisdiction in relation to proceedings of a civil nature. For instance, the pecuniary jurisdiction where the Court is presided over by a chief magistrate has been increased from KSh.7 million/= to KSh.20 million/=. The Chief Justice is however empowered to revise the pecuniary limits of the civil jurisdiction by a Gazette notice, by taking into account inflation and prevailing economic conditions. The presiding judicial officer in Magistrate court could be a Chief Magistrate, Senior Principal Magistrate, Senior Resident Magistrate, Resident Magistrate or Principle Magistrate. Their authorities vary in administrative responsibility and range of fining and sentencing abilities. The Judicature Act is the statute passed by parliament detailing the varying powers and jurisdiction of Magistrates and Judges.

Kadhi's Court
Article 169 1(b) of the Constitution of Kenya 2010 creates Kadhi's court. This is a court that hears civil matters relating to Sharia law. The parties involved must all be followers of Islam and all must agree that the matter to be decided under Islamic law. The matter must be civil in nature e.g. Divorce, succession etc. The court is headed by a Chief Kadhi and parliament is given the authority to enact laws describing the guidelines, qualification and jurisdiction of this court. Appeals from Kadhi Court are heard by the High Court.

Martial Courts 
Article 169 1(c) of the constitution of Kenya 2010 creates the Martial courts. Generally, this type of jurisdiction involves a group of law administrators, that is, the military court where matters involving members of the Kenya Defense Forces are heard. Appeals from this court are heard by the High Court.

Core Values 
The judiciary is guided by the following core values:

 Professionalism
 Integrity
 Diligence
 Team work
 Courage
 Humility

Administration within the Judiciary

The chief administrator of the Supreme Court is the Chief Justice, who is the President of the Supreme Court. One of his/her responsibilities is to come up with procedures for running the courts, as well as decisions on staffing and where new courts should be opened. Certain situations dictate that the Chief Justice appoint a judge or panel of judges to deal with a specific matter. The Deputy Chief Justice is the deputy president of the Supreme Court.

The judges of the High Court and the Court of Appeal each elect a member to deal with administrative issues as well as represent them in the Judicial Service Commission.

The Chief Registrar of the Judiciary has the responsibility of being the chief administrator and accounting officer of the Judiciary. The Court of Appeal, High Court and Magistrate Court all have a Registrar to serve as administrator, record keeper and accounting officer in each of the courts.

Judicial Service Commission

An independent Judicial Service Commission has been set up to handle the appointment of judges. They will recommend a list of persons to be appointed as judges by the President.

Chief Justice

The Chief Justice of Kenya is the head of the Judiciary, the President of the Supreme Court and the Chairperson of the Judicial Service Commission. The chief justice is appointed by the country's President on the recommendation of the Judicial Service Commission and subject to the approval of the National Assembly. 

The current Chief Justice is Martha Koome, who was appointed to the office by President Uhuru Kenyatta after the previous Chief Justice, David Kenani Maraga, retired on 12 January 2021.

See also 

 Judicial Service Commission (Kenya)
 Kenya Judges and Magistrates Vetting Board

References

Further reading
  - Published online on 27 April 2015

External links

 
Government of Kenya
Law of Kenya